Lake Bonney, Bonney Lake, Lake Bonny or Bonny Lake may refer to:

Antarctica
Lake Bonney (Antarctica), a frozen saline lake in the McMurdo Dry Valleys

Australia
Lake Bonney SE, a freshwater lake in the South East near Millicent, South Australia
Lake Bonney Riverland, a freshwater lake in the Riverland near Barmera, South Australia

United States
Bonny Lakes, two high mountain ponds in the Eagle Cap Wilderness, Oregon 
Bonny Lake (Florida), a lake in Florida
Bonney Lake, Washington, a city in Pierce County, Washington 
Bonny Lake State Park, a former state park in Colorado